The 2001 CONCACAF Under-20 Championship was played from 28 February to 22 Match 2001, the competition was divided into two groups of 4 teams, the top two from each group qualified to the 2001 FIFA World Youth Championship held in Argentina.

Qualified teams

The following teams qualified for the tournament:

Squads

Group A

Group B

See also
 2001 CONCACAF U-20 Tournament qualifying
 2001 FIFA World Youth Championship
 CONCACAF

References

Results by RSSSF

2001
under
2001 in youth association football